From January 28 through February 4, 2017, a large number of protests at international airports and other locations were held across the United States and abroad, in opposition to Donald Trump's Executive Order 13769, known as Protecting the Nation from Foreign Terrorist Entry into the United States.

United States

International

See also
 Day Without Immigrants 2017

References

External links
 

2017 in American politics
2017 protests
2017-related lists
Executive Order 13769
Foreign relations of the United States
Human rights in the United States
Human rights-related lists
January 2017 events in the United States
Lists of places
Protests against Donald Trump
Protest marches